Suchart Pichi (born 28 February 1979) is a Thai diver. He competed at the 1996 Summer Olympics and the 2000 Summer Olympics.

References

External links
 

1979 births
Living people
Suchart Pichi
Suchart Pichi
Divers at the 1996 Summer Olympics
Divers at the 2000 Summer Olympics
Place of birth missing (living people)
Asian Games medalists in diving
Divers at the 1994 Asian Games
Divers at the 1998 Asian Games
Divers at the 2002 Asian Games
Divers at the 2006 Asian Games
Suchart Pichi
Medalists at the 1998 Asian Games
Suchart Pichi
Suchart Pichi